BK Bansal also Bal Kishan Bansal (born 1953)  was  Director-General of Corporate Affairs in Union Government. He died on 27 September 2016, after accusing 3 CBI officers of torture in his suicide note. His 25-year-old son Yogesh Bansal also killed himself on the same day at their residence in Neelkanth Apartments in East Delhi.

Arrest in Bribery
BK Bansal was arrested on alleged charges of accepting bribe of Rs 9 lakh. He was accused of attempt to scuttle a probe against a Mumbai-based pharmaceutical company. Bansal's wife Satyabala, aged 58, daughter Neha, aged 28, committed suicide on 19 July 2016, after Bansal was sent to CBI custody. A special CBI court had later granted him bail in August.

See also
 Ashok Khemka

References

Indian civil servants
Indian government officials
1953 births
2016 deaths
Suicides in India